Green Lake is a lake in Hunter Mountains in the Southland Region of New Zealand located to the north of Lake Monowai. The lake has no surface outlets but probably feeds several streams draining to lake Monowai via springs. The lake is a basin in the debris of the Green Lake Landslide, which is the largest known above-sea-level landslide on earth.

The New Zealand Department of Conservation maintains a tramping hut on the northern shore, part of the Borland Road / Lake Monowai circuit.

References

Landslide-dammed lakes
Lakes of Fiordland